Suwannee Springs (also spelled Suwanee Springs) is an unincorporated community located on the Suwannee River in Suwannee County, Florida, United States. The main spring flows inside a man-made wall fifteen feet high and three feet thick of limestone rock, this wall was built in the late 1890s.

Suwannee Springs is a second magnitude spring with an average flow of 23.4 cubic feet per second (cfs).  The spring emerges from Oligocene age limestone and discharges hard, sulphur water.  The water maintains a year-round temperature of 70 to 76 degrees.

See also
Suwannee Springs

References 

Springs of Florida
Unincorporated communities in Suwannee County, Florida
Bodies of water of Suwannee County, Florida
Unincorporated communities in Florida